"To Be Young" is a song by English singer Anne-Marie featuring American rapper and singer Doja Cat, released as a single on 17 July 2020.

Background
Anne-Marie began teasing the song on social media in the days prior to its release; revealing the lyrics "We're all a mess, but I guess this is what it feels like to be young", subsequently revealing the single's artwork.

Charts

Weekly charts

Year-end charts

Release history

References

2020 singles
2020 songs
Anne-Marie (singer) songs
Doja Cat songs
Songs written by Louis Bell
Songs written by Doja Cat
Songs written by Teo Halm
Songs written by Anne-Marie (singer)